Tawan Dueat (lit. "Boiling Sun") is a 2011 drama/romance/action Thai television soap opera that stars Prin Suparat, Urassaya Sperbund, Chalida Vijitvongthong, and Thanavat Vatthanaputi. It airs on Channel 3.

Synopsis
After the young Tawan had escaped the massacre at Fah Roong Farm in Phu Prakarn City with his father's best friend Saroj (Somchai Khemklad), Tawan (Prin Suparat) was taught and raised to be a strong young man. In order to have a revenge, Tawan had disguised himself with the men who works for Charan (Johnny Anfone) the man who led a bunch of bandits invade Fah Roong Farm and kill people there. There he met Singh (Thanavat Vatthanaputi) a gang thief who helps him on his plans, and the two later became good friends.

Tawan and Singh arrives at Charan's place, which used to belong to Tawan's family, the two came across an abandoned farm house which only lives sisters Roong (Urassaya Sperbund) and Ploy Kwan (Chalida Vijitvongthong) who came to be the step daughters of Charan.

Cast
Prin Suparat (Mark) as Tawan/Seur
Urassaya Sperbund (Yaya) as Phet Roong "Roong"/Khun Noo
Chalida Vijitvongthong (Mint) as Ploy Kwan/Khun Noo
Thanavat Vatthanaputi (Pope) as Singh

Supporting Cast
Somchai Khemklad as Saroj
Johnny Anfone as Charan
Saranyoo Prachakrit (Beam) as Decha
Dom Haetrakul as Naroong

Guest Cast
Chatchai Plengpanich (Nok) 
Sinjai Plengpanich (Nok)

References

Thai television soap operas
2011 Thai television series debuts
2011 Thai television series endings
Thai action television series
Channel 3 (Thailand) original programming